Joan Femenías del Salto (born 19 August 1996) is a Spanish footballer who plays as a goalkeeper for Levante UD.

Club career
Born in Manacor, Mallorca, Balearic Islands, Femenías joined Villarreal CF's youth setup in 2013, from CE Constància. He made his senior debut with the reserves on 22 March 2015, coming on as a second-half substitute for Anton Shvets in a 3–1 Segunda División B away defeat of CD Eldense.

Ahead of the 2015–16 campaign, Femenías was assigned to the C-team in Tercera División. He was definitely promoted to the B's in July 2016, but only became a regular starter in the 2018–19 season after the departure of Ander Cantero.

On 17 July 2019, free agent Femenías signed a one-year deal with Segunda División newcomers CF Fuenlabrada. A third-choice behind Biel Ribas and Pol Freixanet, he made his professional debut on 28 June 2020, replacing the latter in the first half of a 1–1 home draw against Extremadura UD.

On 12 August 2020, Femenías signed a two-year deal with fellow second division side Real Oviedo. He was an undisputed starter for the side before moving to freshly relegated side Levante UD on 1 July 2022.

References

External links

1996 births
Living people
Sportspeople from Manacor
Spanish footballers
Footballers from Mallorca
Association football goalkeepers
Segunda División players
Segunda División B players
Tercera División players
Villarreal CF C players
Villarreal CF B players
CF Fuenlabrada footballers
Real Oviedo players
Levante UD footballers